Thout 30 - Coptic Calendar - Paopi 2

The first day of the Coptic month of Paopi, the second month of the Coptic year. On a common year, this day corresponds to September 28, of the Julian Calendar, and October 11, of the Gregorian Calendar. This day falls in the Coptic season of Akhet, the season of inundation.

Commemorations

Saints 

 The martyrdom of Saint Anastasia

References 

Days of the Coptic calendar